Tonto National Monument is a National Monument in the Superstition Mountains, in Gila County of central Arizona. The area lies on the northeastern edge of the Sonoran Desert ecoregion, an arid habitat with annual rainfall of about 16 inches (400 mm). The Salt River runs through this area, providing a rare, year-round source of water.

Cliff dwellings
Well-preserved cliff dwellings were occupied by the Salado culture during the 13th, 14th, and early 15th centuries. The people farmed in the Salt River Valley, and supplemented their diet by hunting and gathering native plants. The Salado were fine craftspeople, producing some of the most flamboyant polychrome pottery and intricately woven textiles to be found in the Southwest. Some of the artifacts excavated nearby are on display in the visitor center museum.

The Tonto National Monument Archeological District was listed on the National Register of Historic Places on October 15, 1966.  Tonto National Monument, Lower Ruin and Tonto National Monument, Upper Ruin are archeological sites that were NRHP-listed in 1989.

Natural history
The National Monument is surrounded by the Tonto National Forest, which includes low plains, desert scrubland, and alpine pine forests.

The Upper Sonoran ecosystem is known for its characteristic saguaro cacti. Other common plants include: cholla, prickly pear, hedgehog, and barrel cactus (flowering from April to June); yucca, sotol, and agave; creosote bush and ocotillo; palo verde and mesquite trees; an amazing variety of colorful wild flowers in good years (February to March); and a lush riparian area which supports large Arizona Walnut, Arizona Sycamore, and hackberry trees.

It also serves as a home for native animals such as whitetail and mule deer, mountain lion, bobcat, three rattlesnake species and many more.

Wilderness areas

The area around Tonto National Monument also includes several designated National Wilderness Areas, including Four Peaks, Superstition, and Salome Wilderness Areas.

Photo gallery

See also
 List of national monuments of the United States

Notes

References

External links

 Apache Trail website: Ancient Cliff Dwellings Info
 NPS: official Tonto National Monument website
 Tonto National Monument: Saving a National Treasure
 American Southwest, a National Park Service Discover Our Shared Heritage Travel Itinerary
 Tonto National Monument: a traveller's diary

Archaeological sites in Arizona
National Park Service National Monuments in Arizona
Cliff dwellings
Museums in Gila County, Arizona
Native American museums in Arizona
Protected areas of Gila County, Arizona
Archaeological sites on the National Register of Historic Places in Arizona
Former populated places in Gila County, Arizona
Protected areas established in 1907
1907 establishments in Arizona Territory
Superstition Mountains
Tonto National Forest
National Register of Historic Places in Gila County, Arizona
Populated places on the National Register of Historic Places in Arizona
Ancient Puebloan archaeological sites in Arizona